María Fernanda Cornejo (born March 24, 1989) is an Ecuadorian fashion model and beauty queen who was crowned Miss International 2011. She has modeled for fashion companies including Chloé, DKNY, and Dior.

Early life
Fernanda Cornejo lives and works in Guayaquil, Ecuador. She is one of the most requested models in her country. Cornejo is taking a bachelor's degree in nutrition at UEES and speaks Spanish. She enjoys singing, going to the beach, playing basketball and doing pilates. Now she is a Top Model from Elite Models in United States   .

Miss Ecuador 2011

Miss International 2011
As the official representative of her country to the 2011 Miss International pageant, the titleholder, Elizabeth Mosquera of Venezuela crowned her as Miss International 2011.

References

External links
Official Miss Ecuador website

1989 births
Living people
Ecuadorian beauty pageant winners
Miss International winners
Miss International 2011 delegates
People from Quito